Rivière Du Poste is a village in the south part of Mauritius located in both Savanne and Grand Port district.  The locality is about 19 miles (30 km) south of Port Louis, the country's capital.  The village is administered by the Rivière du Poste Village Council under the aegis of the Savanne District Council. According to the census made by Statistics Mauritius in 2011, the population was at 2,170. The neighboring villages are La Flora (North West), Mare Tabac and Rose Belle (North East) and Camp Diable and Riviere Dragon in the south of the village.

History 
Rivière du Poste is named after the second largest river in Mauritius which crosses by the village and separates it into two districts: Savanne and Grand Port. The local Post office opened in 1909 which was prior, a Railway Station.

A popular attraction is the Pont Rouge (English: Red bridge), an old railway track which is now used by pedestrians to cross the river. There are numerous attractions such as waterfalls across the river at different spots.

Sub locality 
The village itself is distributed into 4 parts:
 Camp Rabaud 60701
 Camp Siajee 60702
 Terrain Maurice 60704
 Rivière Du Poste 60703

See also 
 Districts of Mauritius
 List of places in Mauritius

References 

Populated places in Mauritius
Savanne District
Grand Port District